Euleechia is a genus of tiger moths in the family Erebidae erected by Harrison Gray Dyar Jr. in 1900.

Species
Euleechia bieti (Oberthür, 1883)
Euleechia miranda (Oberthür, 1894)
Euleechia pratti (Leech, 1890)

References

 , 1926: Die Schmetterlinge der Stötznerschen Ausbeute, Phalaenae, Nachtfalter. Deutsche Entomologische Zeitschrift, Iris 40: 44-55, Dresden.
 , 1900: Change of preoccupied names. The Canadian Entomologist 32 (11): 347, Ottawa.
 , 1995: Systematic position of genus Nikaeoides Matsumura (Lepidoptera, Arctiidae). Academia Humanities, Social Science (62): 179-183, Nansan University, Nagoya.
 , 1899: Lepidoptera Heterocera from Northern China, Japan, and Corea. Part II. The Transactions of the Entomological Society of London 1899: 99-215, London.
 , 1931: 6000 Illustrated Insects of Japan-Empire: 1497+191 p., Tokyo (in Japanese).

Callimorphina
Moth genera